In mathematical set theory, an Ulam matrix is an array of subsets of a cardinal number with certain properties. Ulam matrices were introduced by Stanislaw Ulam in his 1930 work on measurable cardinals: they may be used, for example, to show that a real-valued measurable cardinal is weakly inaccessible.

Definition

Suppose that κ and λ are cardinal numbers, and let F be a λ-complete filter on λ. An Ulam matrix is a collection of subsets Aαβ of λ indexed by α in κ, β in λ such that 
If β is not γ then Aαβ and Aαγ are disjoint.
For each β the union of the sets Aαβ is in the filter F.

References

Set theory